Castelnuovo is an Italian surname which loosely translates as Newcastle in English. Notable people with the surname include:

 Emma Castelnuovo (1913–2014), Italian mathematician and teacher
Enrico Castelnuovo (1839–1915), Italian writer
 Guido Castelnuovo (1865–1952), Italian mathematician
 Mario Castelnuovo-Tedesco (1895–1968), Italian composer
 Nino Castelnuovo (1936–2021), Italian actor

Italian-language surnames